Eslamabad (also Romanized as Eslāmābād) is a village in Beyza Rural District, Beyza District, Sepidan County, Fars Province, Iran. At the 2006 census, its population was 248, in 53 families.

References 

Populated places in Beyza County